Carenum habile is a species of ground beetle in the subfamily Scaritinae. It was described by Sloane in 1892.

References

habile
Beetles described in 1892